Mala Mala Airport  is a small airport in Mala Mala Game Reserve, South Africa.

Airlines and destinations

External links

Airports in South Africa
Transport in Mpumalanga